Charles Pereira Mendes Monteiro (born 25 May 1994) is a São Toméan footballer who plays for Portuguese club Vilafranquense as a left back.

Club career
Born in São Tomé, Monteiro made his senior debuts in 2013 with Vilafranquense in the Lisbon FA Honour Division.

International career
Monteiro made his debut for São Tomé and Príncipe on 4 June 2016 in a 2017 Africa Cup of Nations qualification 1-2 loss against Cape Verde.

References

External links

1994 births
Living people
People from São Tomé
São Tomé and Príncipe footballers
Association football defenders
São Tomé and Príncipe international footballers
São Tomé and Príncipe expatriate footballers
São Tomé and Príncipe expatriate sportspeople in Portugal
Expatriate footballers in Portugal